Mohsen Esmaeili (born 6 April 1964) is an Iranian consulting jurist and member of both the Guardian Council and  Assembly of Experts. As a member of the Guardian Council, Esmaeili has veto power over all parliamentary legislations. He has written several books and extensive number of legal articles including large number of project research papers in Persian.

In 2016, he was elected as a member of Assembly of Experts. He is the first non-cleric member of the assembly.

Personal life
Esmaeili was born in Iran in 1964. He received his Ph.D in private law magna cum laude from Tarbiat Modares University and was recognized by the Ministry of Science. Research and Technology for ranking first in the Iran for undergraduate, graduate studies.

Career
Esmaeili is a consulting jurist and member of the powerful Guardian Council of the Parliament of Iran. Also, Esmaeili has represented Iran in the United Nations' Economic and Social Commission for Asia and the Pacific, as the General Director of Civil Registration of Iran's National Organization for Civil Registration.

Bibliography

 Damage theory Amir Kabir Publications 
 Cairo branch Soroush Publications  
 Press law and its evolution in the rights of Iran Soroush Publications 
 Theoretical analysis of the Guardian Council in the 1381 budget Council Research Press 
 And responsibilities of the position of president, office of the Islamic culture  
 Goes DOWN in jurisprudence and political sovereignty and the fundamental rights, office of the Islamic culture  
 Commercial advertising rights in Iran and the world with the participation of Amir Kabir Publications Research Center, a program of studies and assessment of IRIB
 Students, university policy (monitoring Brmjmvh Scientific Conference with the same name), the representative of Supreme Leader in partnership with the Ministry of Culture and Islamic Guidance 
 Overview of the Koran, the basis of publications, selected third largest Quran Trade Ministry of Culture and Islamic Guidance. 
 Lasting lessons, new look at Nhjalblaghh Volume I, Soroush Publications 
 Lasting lessons, new look  Nhjalblaghh Volume II, Soroush Publications

References

External link 

 Mohsen Esmaeili's Official Website

Iranian jurists
1964 births
Living people
Members of the Guardian Council
Members of the Assembly of Experts